Cigaretta is an avant-garde band from Bulgaria. The band's members are Vla Doom (vocals and guitar), Klim End (bass), Mic Hail (drums), Bo Betz (laptop, machines and keyboards) and D Echo (guitar and vocals). The band's music has been labelled “doomy blues”, and has been called difficult to define; they attempt to combine elements of widely varying genres, including alternative, doom metal, and progressive rock.

Cigaretta's discography includes the full-length albums 14 songS, released in December 2003, and Pluke, released in April 2006, both through Stain Studio.

External links
Official CIGARETTA 14 SongS homepage
CIGARETTA Band Profile on MySpace.com

Bulgarian musical groups